Newark is an unincorporated community in Beech Creek Township, Greene County, Indiana.

History
Newark was named after Newark, Ohio. A post office was established at Newark in 1866, and remained in operation until it was discontinued in 1910.

Geography

References

Unincorporated communities in Greene County, Indiana
Unincorporated communities in Indiana
Bloomington metropolitan area, Indiana